In mathematics, the Teichmüller–Tukey lemma (sometimes named just Tukey's lemma), named after John Tukey and Oswald Teichmüller, is a lemma that states that every nonempty collection of finite character has a maximal element with respect to inclusion. Over Zermelo–Fraenkel set theory, the Teichmüller–Tukey lemma is equivalent to the axiom of choice, and therefore to the well-ordering theorem, Zorn's lemma, and the Hausdorff maximal principle.

Definitions
A family of sets  is of finite character provided it has the following properties:

Statement of the lemma
Let  be a set and let .

Applications
In linear algebra, the lemma may be used to show the existence of a basis. Let V be a vector space. Consider the collection   of linearly independent sets of vectors. This is a collection of finite character. Thus, a maximal set exists, which must then span V and be a basis for V.

Notes

References 
 Brillinger, David R. "John Wilder Tukey" 

Families of sets
Order theory
Axiom of choice
Lemmas in set theory